Chryseobacterium limigenitum is a Gram-negative and rod-shaped bacteria from the genus of Chryseobacterium which has been isolated from dehydrated sludge.

References

External links
Type strain of Chryseobacterium limigenitum at BacDive -  the Bacterial Diversity Metadatabase

limigenitum
Bacteria described in 2015